Goz Beïda is the capital of the Sila (or Dar Sila) region of Chad, as well as the main town (chef-lieu) of the Kimiti department. Prior to 2008, Goz Beïda was part of the Ouaddaï Region's former Sila Department.

The town has been seriously affected by the conflict in Darfur, which has spilled over into the surrounding area and resulted in large numbers of refugees living in the town.

The town is served by Goz Beïda Airport.

Attack

October 2006
On 22 October 2006, the main unified Chadian rebel group, the Union of Forces for Democracy attacked the town. Conflicting reports initially surfaced as to whether the town was taken by the Union repulsed by the government troops. However, it was later confirmed that the town was taken by the Union, as were several other Chadian cities.

June 2008
On 14 June 2008 Chadian rebels trying to topple President Idriss Deby attacked Goz Beïda, injuring at least 25 people. The rebels and the Chadian army were involved in a firefight; Irish Army troops, part of the European Union Force, were fired at, but none were injured. A rebel group, the National Alliance, claim to control the town.

See also
Dar Sila

References

External links
 14,000 refugees in camp near Goz Beïda
 UNHCR report from Goz Beïda

Sila Region
Populated places in Chad